The 2019 Australian federal budget was the federal budget to fund government services and operations for the 2019–20 financial year. The budget was presented to the House of Representatives by Treasurer Josh Frydenberg on 2 April 2019. It was the sixth budget to be handed down by the Liberal/National Coalition since their election to government at the 2013 federal election, and the first budget to be handed down by Frydenberg and the Morrison Government. All of the figures below are estimates published in the 2019-20 budget documents.

Background

Forecasts

Revenues

Income taxation

Gross income tax withholding $218.1 billion

Gross other indivuals $47.6 billion

Refunds $36.9 billion

Fringe benefits tax    $3.93 billion

Company tax $98.9 billion

Superannuation taxation $9.71 billion

Petroleum resource rent tax $1.4 billion

Indirect taxation

Goods and services tax $67.364 billion

Wine equalisation tax $1.08 billion

Luxury car tax $640  million

Excise & customs duty $45.69 billion

Major bank levy $1.6 billion

Agricultural levies   $520 million

Other taxes $6.763 billion

Non-taxation receipts

Sales of goods & services $15.745 billion

Interest received $5.701 billion

Dividends $6.165 billion

Other non-taxation receipts $11.512 billion

Memorandum

Capital gains tax $18.1 billion

Medicare levy $18.15 billion

Note: Capital gains tax is part of gross other individuals, company tax and superannuation fund taxes, while the Medicare Levy is included in income taxes.

Expenses

Total $500.872 billion

General public services  $23.614 billion
 
Defence $32.243 billion 
 
Public order & safety  $5.919 billion
 
Education $36.350 billion 
 
Health $81.777 billion 
 
Social Security & Welfare $180.125 billion
 
Housing and community services $5.907 billion 
 
Recreation & culture $3.849 billion 
 
Fuel & energy $8.171 billion 
 
Agriculture, forestry & fishing $2.871 billion 
 
Mining, manufacturing & construction $3.442 billion 
 
Transport & communication $9.038 billion 
 
Other economic affairs $9.297 billion
 
Public debt interest $17.037 billion 
 
Nominal superannuation interest $11.127 billion 
 
General revenue assistance - States and Territories $69.053 billion 
 
General revenue assistance - Local governments $1.275 billion 
 
Natural disaster relief $11 million 
 
Contingency reserve  -$216 million

Expenditure

Debt and deficit
Deficit

The Budget deficit for 2018/19 is expected to be $4.162 billion, falling from $10.141 billion in 2017/18.

The surplus for 2019-20 is expected to be around $7 billion.

Debt

The government's debt level was forecast to be $629 billion in 2019/20.

Opposition and crossbench response

Reception

See also

 Australian government debt
 Economy of Australia
 Taxation in Australia

References

External links
Official website
Budget 2019: Winners and losers at ABC News
Budget Speech transcript, delivered by Josh Frydenberg

Australian budgets
Australian federal budget
Australian federal budget
2019 in Australian politics
April 2019 events in Australia